The Washboard Union is a Canadian country music group from Vancouver, British Columbia led by principal members David Roberts, Aaron Grain (aka Brett Ellis) and Chris Duncombe.

Biography
Aaron Grain and Chris Duncombe met in Kelowna, British Columbia at age 15 when Duncombe's father began dating Grain's mother. Duncombe and Grain eventually moved to Vancouver, where they met David Roberts, who was living in a Point Grey mansion. The three began writing and singing together. They originally performed under the name Run GMC. Their debut album, The Washboard Union, was released in 2012 and produced by Garth Richardson and Bob Ezrin.

In January 2015, The Washboard Union recorded an extended play, In My Bones, at RCA Studio A in Nashville, Tennessee with producer Trey Bruce. It was released by Slaight Music/Warner Music Canada on July 10, 2015. The first single, "Some Day", went top 40, and the second and third singles, "Maybe It's the Moonshine" & "Shot of Glory", reached the top 10 and top 5 respectively on the Billboard Canada Country chart. In October 2015, The Washboard Union won the British Columbia Country Music Association Award for Roots Canadiana of the Year.

The Washboard Union's next album, What We're Made Of, was produced by Matt Rovey (Zac Brown Band, Dean Brody) in Nashville and Jeff "Diesel" Dalziel in Toronto and Vancouver over the winter of 2017/18.  The album's first single, “Shine”, was the band's third Top Ten Country Radio hit which they performed live on the Canadian Country Music Awards and walked away with a CCMA Award for 2017 Roots Artist of the Year.

In 2018 the group performed in Liverpool, Nova Scotia at the Queens Place Emera Centre.

On November 22, 2019, The Washboard Union released "Country Thunder" as the leadoff single to their third studio album, Everbound, which was released on April 24, 2020. The album's second single was "Dock Rock," followed by "If She Only Knew" and "Never Run Outta Road."

Discography

Studio albums

Extended plays

Singles

Christmas singles

Music videos

Awards and nominations

Tours

Headlining
 2017 Dates: Rockin' River Music Fest in Merrit, BC;
 2018 Dates: July 12 in Calgary, AB at Calgary Stampede;
 2019 Dates: May 8 in Halifax NS; May 10 in Moncton, NB; May 12 in St. John's, NL; August 2 in Lake Cowichan BC.

Supporting
 Happy Endings World Tour (2018) with Old Dominion (Western Canada Only)

References

External links

Canadian country music groups
Musical groups established in 2010
Musical groups from Vancouver
Warner Music Group artists
Juno Award for Breakthrough Group of the Year winners
Canadian Country Music Association Rising Star Award winners
Canadian Country Music Association Group or Duo of the Year winners
2010 establishments in Canada